The 1981–82 NBA season was the Hawks' 33rd season in the NBA and 14th season in Atlanta.

Draft picks

Roster

Regular season

Season standings

z - clinched division title
y - clinched division title
x - clinched playoff spot

Record vs. opponents

Game log

Regular season

|- align="center" bgcolor="#ffcccc"
| 1
| October 31
| Philadelphia

|- align="center" bgcolor="#ccffcc"
| 4
| November 6
| @ Philadelphia
|- align="center" bgcolor="#ffcccc"
| 13
| November 28
| Boston

|- align="center" bgcolor="#ffcccc"
| 14
| December 1
| Philadelphia
|- align="center" bgcolor="#ffcccc"
| 19
| December 11
| @ Boston
|- align="center" bgcolor="#ccffcc"
| 20
| December 12
| Boston
|- align="center" bgcolor="#ffcccc"
| 24
| December 20
| @ Los Angeles
|- align="center" bgcolor="#ccffcc"
| 26
| December 26
| @ San Antonio

|- align="center" bgcolor="#ffcccc"
| 33
| January 13
| @ Boston
|- align="center" bgcolor="#ccffcc"
| 34
| January 15
| @ Philadelphia
|- align="center" bgcolor="#ffcccc"
| 38
| January 22
| San Antonio

|- align="center" bgcolor="#ffcccc"
| 45
| February 9
| Los Angeles

|- align="center" bgcolor="#ffcccc"
| 56
| March 5
| @ Philadelphia
|- align="center" bgcolor="#ffcccc"
| 63
| March 17
| @ Boston

|- align="center" bgcolor="#ffcccc"
| 73
| April 2
| Boston
|- align="center" bgcolor="#ccffcc"
| 77
| April 9
| Philadelphia

Playoffs

|- align="center" bgcolor="#ffcccc"
| 1
| April 21
| @ Philadelphia
| L 76–111
| John Drew (18)
| Dan Roundfield (11)
| Rory Sparrow (8)
| Spectrum11,250
| 1–0
|- align="center" bgcolor="#ffcccc"
| 2
| April 23
| Philadelphia
| W 95–98 (OT)
| Dan Roundfield (29)
| Dan Roundfield (11)
| Eddie Johnson (4)
| Omni Coliseum8,703
| 2–0
|-

Player statistics

Season

Playoffs

Player Statistics Citation:

Awards and records
 Dan Roundfield, NBA All-Defensive First Team

Transactions

References

See also
 1981-82 NBA season

Atlanta Hawks seasons
Atl
Atlanta Haw
Atlanta Haw